Sudheer Sharma is a Nepalese writer and journalist. He is the Editor-in-Chief of Nepal's largest selling daily Kantipur from 2008 to 2018 and 2019 to till now. He is also the author of best selling books Prayogshala and The Nepal Nexus.

References

Nepalese male writers
Living people
1975 births
People from Jhapa District
Nepalese journalists
Khas people